Sakhagachhi is a village in Pirojpur District in the Barisal Division of southwestern Bangladesh.

References

Populated places in Pirojpur District